Carnegie railway station is located on the Pakenham and Cranbourne lines in Victoria, Australia. It serves the south-eastern Melbourne suburb of Carnegie, and it opened on 2 April 1879 as Rosstown. It was renamed Carnegie on 1 May 1909.

History

Opening one month after the railway line from Caulfield was extended to Oakleigh, Carnegie station, like the suburb itself, gets it name from philanthropist Andrew Carnegie. Originally named Rosstown, after entrepreneur William Ross, the name change occurred in May 1909 after Ross' failed speculative developments made the name unpopular. Residents supported the name change to Carnegie, who were seeking to obtain funds from the philanthropist for a library, which was to be unsuccessful.

In 1911, a crossover was provided at the Down end of the station. In 1966, it was abolished.

In 1967, boom barriers replaced interlocked gates at the former Koornang Road level crossing, which was located at the Up end of the station. The signal box, which protected the level crossing, was also abolished during this time.

In March 2014, the Level Crossing Removal Authority announced a grade separation project to replace the Koornang Road level crossing immediately to the west of the station. This included rebuilding the station above its previous location. On 18 June 2018, the new station opened.

Platforms and services

Carnegie has one island platform with two faces. It is serviced by Metro Trains' Pakenham and Cranbourne line services.

Platform 1:
  all stations and limited express services to Flinders Street
  all stations and limited express services to Flinders Street

Platform 2:
  all stations and limited express services to Pakenham
  all stations services to Cranbourne

Future services:
In addition to the current services the Network Development Plan Metropolitan Rail proposes linking the Pakenham and Cranbourne lines to both the Sunbury line and under-construction Melbourne Airport rail link via the Metro Tunnel.
  express services to West Footscray and Sunbury (2025 onwards)
  express services to Melbourne Airport (2029 onwards)

Transport links

CDC Melbourne operates four routes via Carnegie station, under contract to Public Transport Victoria:
 : Glen Waverley station – St Kilda
 : Kew – Oakleigh station
 : Middle Brighton station – Chadstone Shopping Centre
  : Stud Park Shopping Centre (Rowville) – Caulfield station (shared with Ventura Bus Lines)

Ventura Bus Lines operates one route via Carnegie station, under contract to Public Transport Victoria:
  : Stud Park Shopping Centre (Rowville) – Caulfield station (shared with CDC Melbourne)

Gallery

References

External links
 
 Melway map at street-directory.com.au

Railway stations in Melbourne
Railway stations in Australia opened in 1879
Railway stations in the City of Glen Eira